Miha Gregorič (born 22 August 1989) is a Slovenian footballer who plays for Cjarlins Muzane.

Career
In September 2018, Gregorič moved abroad and joined Italian club Fidelis Andria. In July 2019, he joined another Serie D club, ASD Cjarlins Muzane.

References

External links

PrvaLiga profile 

1989 births
Living people
People from Šempeter pri Gorici
Slovenian footballers
Slovenia youth international footballers
Association football defenders
ND Gorica players
NK Brda players
FC Koper players
S.S. Fidelis Andria 1928 players
Slovenian PrvaLiga players
Serie D players
Slovenian expatriate footballers
Slovenian expatriate sportspeople in Italy
Expatriate footballers in Italy